Saint-Frajou is a commune in the Haute-Garonne department in southwestern France. The 20th-century historian René Souriac (born 1941) is from Saint-Frajou.

Population

See also
Communes of the Haute-Garonne department

References

Communes of Haute-Garonne